Alain Gaspoz (born 16 May 1970 in Bagnes) is a retired Swiss-Beninese football player who last played for FC Bagnes.

International
He was part of the Beninese 2004 African Nations Cup team, who finished bottom of their group in the first round of competition, thus failing to secure qualification for the quarter-finals.

Honours

Player
FC Sion
Swiss Championship: 1996–97
Swiss Cup: 1995–96, 1996–97, 2005–06

References

External links
 Profile by Bagnes Official Site
 

1970 births
Living people
Citizens of Benin through descent
Beninese footballers
Swiss men's footballers
Benin international footballers
Swiss people of Beninese descent
Swiss sportspeople of African descent
2004 African Cup of Nations players
2008 Africa Cup of Nations players
FC St. Gallen players
FC Winterthur players
FC Lugano players
Servette FC players
FC Zürich players
FC Aarau players
FC Sion players
People from Entremont district
People from Bagnes
Association football defenders
FC Fribourg players
Sportspeople from Valais